Amphia is a genus of moths of the family Noctuidae.

Species
Amphia gigantea Viette, 1958
Amphia hepialoides Guenee, 1852
Amphia sogai Viette, 1967
Amphia subunita Guenee, 1852
Amphia voeltzkowi Viette, 1979

References
Natural History Museum Lepidoptera genus database

 
Noctuoidea genera